John Dormer (c. 1611 – 22 May 1679) was an English politician who sat in the House of Commons  at various times between 1645 and 1660.

Dormer was the son of Sir Fleetwood Dormer, of Shipdon Leigh, Buckinghamshire and was baptised at Quainton, Buckinghamshire on 6 January 1612.  He matriculated at Magdalen Hall, Oxford on 25 January 1628, aged 16 and was awarded B.A.on  23 February 1628 and M.A.on 8 June 1630.  He was incorporated at Cambridge University and was awarded MA in 1632. He was admitted at Lincoln's Inn on 7 February 1629 and was called to the bar in 1636.

In May  1645, Dormer was elected Member of Parliament for Buckingham in the Long Parliament. He sat until 1653.
 
In 1660, Dormer was elected MP for Buckingham in the Convention Parliament.
 
Dormer was of Lee Grange, Buckinghamshire, and of Purston, Northamptonshire and died aged 68. His son John was created a baronet and his son Robert was also an MP.

References

1611 births
1679 deaths
Alumni of Magdalen Hall, Oxford
Members of Lincoln's Inn
Alumni of the University of Cambridge
Place of birth missing
People from Buckingham
English MPs 1640–1648
English MPs 1648–1653
English MPs 1660